Ingólfsson may refer to:

Darri Ingolfsson (born 1979), Icelandic actor
Gwen Ingolfsson, main character in the novel Drakon by S. M. Stirling
Haraldur Ingólfsson (born 1970), Icelandic former footballer
Judith Ingolfsson (born 1973), violinist
Viktor Arnar Ingólfsson (born 1955), Icelandic writer of crime fiction

See also
Ingela Olsson
Wingolf